The Talaria of Mercury ( or The Winged Sandals of Hermes ,  or) are winged sandals, a symbol of the Greek messenger god Hermes (Roman equivalent Mercury). They were said to be made by the god Hephaestus of imperishable gold and they flew the god as swift as any bird.

Etymology 
The Latin noun , neuter plural of  signifies "of the ankle". It is not quite certain how the Romans arrived at the meaning of "winged sandals" from this, possibly that the wings were attached at the ankles, or the sandals were tied around the ankles.

Attestations

In ancient Greek literature, the sandals of Hermes are first of all mentioned by Homer ("immortal/divine and of gold"), though not described as "winged".

The Homeric hymn to Hermes from a somewhat later date (520 BC) does not explicitly state the sandals were winged, though they allowed him to leave no footprints while committing his theft of Apollo's cattle.

According to one estimation, it was around 5th century BC when the winged sandals came to be regarded as common (though not indispensable) accoutrements of the god Hermes. One later instance which refers to the sandals being winged is the Orphic Hymns XXVIII to Hermes (3rd century BC to 2nd century AD).

Perseus wears Hermes' sandals to help him slay Medusa. According to Aeschylus, Hermes gives them to him directly.

Latin sources

The term talaria has been employed by Ovid in the 1st century, and prior to him, in perhaps eight instances by various Latin authors (Cicero, Virgil, etc.). The term is usually construed as "winged sandals", and applied almost exclusively to the footwear worn by the god Hermes/Mercury or the hero Perseus.

Medieval interpretation 

In the case of the talaria worn by the swift runner Atalanta (Ovid, Metamorphoses X.591) some translators in the past steered away from recognizing them as footwear, and chose to regard them as "long robes, reaching to the ankle", starting with Planudes in the 14th century. This interpretation was also endorsed in the 17th century by Nicolaas Heinsius's gloss, and persisted in the 19th century with Lewis and Short's dictionary entry for this particular passage. But there are "insuperable" reasons against this "robes" interpretation, for Ovid clearly states in the foregoing passages that Atalanta had disrobed to engage in the foot-race.

Also in the medieval Irish versions of the Aeneid (Imtheachta Aeniasa) and the Destruction of Troy (Togail Troí), Mercury wears a "bird covering" or "feather mantle", which clearly derives from Mercury's talaria, such as described by Virgil.

Sometimes, it has been interpreted that Hermes feet are winged, rather that the wings being part of his sandals.

In popular culture
In Rick Riordan's Percy Jackson & the Olympians series, the Talaria is a pair of sneakers worn by Grover Underwood.

In God of War III, Kratos forcibly takes the Boots of Hermes off the Messenger God's feet by cutting his legs off.

In Terraria, the player can acquire the item Hermes' Boots, which increase the players movement speed.

See also
 EADS Talarion an unmanned air vehicle named after Talaria.
 Hermes also wears a winged petasos, a traveler hat. In other representations he wears a winged helmet.

Explanatory notes

References
Citations

Bibliography

 
 
 Gantz, Timothy (2004). Mythes de la Grèce archaïque, Berlin. pp. 541–543.

External links

Greek mythology
Mythological clothing
Hermes
Flight folklore
Sandals